Lampovo (Russian: Лампово) is a holiday village located in Gatchinsky District, Leningrad Oblast, Russia. Its geographical coordinates are 59° 17' 0" N, 30° 4' 0" E.

It has a population of 1487 people (2010 census) The center of the town is 97 meters above sea level.

History 

The name Lampovo goes back to the Ingrian word "lyamppi", which means "a lively, lively place." This name was first mentioned by Tsarevich Alexei, in 1770, who owned this area. Over time, like many Finnish names of surrounding villages, Lamppi transformed into Lampovo.

In the beginning of the 18th century, the first settlers arrived in this village, the natives of the Arkhangelsk and Vologda oblasts.

The peasants of the village of Lampovo were ranked in the parish of the Orlyna Savior-Transfiguration Church. The Chapel of St. Nicholas the Wonderworker was constructed in Lampovo, located near the Lampovsky cemetery. Precise information about the closing time of the church in Lampovo has not been preserved, but indirect evidence indicates that it operated until the end of the 1920s.

The present community in Lampovo is also made up of holiday housing.

Transport 
Buses 120-T, 505, 506, 506A, 507 from Siversky are available.

There is a train station located 1 kilometer west from the village.

Attractions 
 The Chapel of St. Nicholas 
 "Pavlov's House" - a monument of wooden architecture built in 1863.

References

Rural localities in Leningrad Oblast